Japhina Joseph is a Vincentian cricketer who plays for the Windward Islands and Barbados Royals. In April 2021, Joseph was named in Cricket West Indies' high-performance training camp in Antigua. In June 2021, Joseph was named in the West Indies A Team for their series against Pakistan.

References

External links
 

Year of birth missing (living people)
Living people
Saint Vincent and the Grenadines women cricketers
Windward Islands women cricketers
Place of birth missing (living people)
Barbados Royals (WCPL) cricketers